Boğaziçi, historically Kerküt, is a village in the İslahiye District, Gaziantep Province, Turkey. It is populated by Kurds and had a population of 3118 in 2022.

References

Kurdish settlements in Gaziantep Province
Populated places in Gaziantep Province
Towns in Turkey
İslahiye District